Atlantic Container Line is an American, previously Swedish, shipping company owned by the Italian Grimaldi Group. The company operates large roll-on/roll-off (RORO) container ships between Europe and North America.

History
ACL was formed in Stockholm in 1965 by Olof Wallenius who created a consortium of four shipping companies, Wallenius Lines, Swedish America Line, the Rederi AB Transatlantic and Holland America Line. These were joined by Cunard and CGT in 1967.

In 1976 ACL took over the Care Line, its ships, Mont Royal and Montmorency, and its direct route to Montreal.

Atlantic Conveyor sank on 25 May 1982 after being hit by two Argentine Exocet missiles. She is the only British flagged merchant ship to be sunk by missile.

Fleet

Current ships

The new Generation 4 ships, introduced in 2015, are faster and more fuel efficient than their predecessors.  They are still ConRO, combination roll-on/roll-off (RORO) and container, ships but with the accommodation in the middle of the ship rather than at the stern as in the previous generation.

Previous ships

See also
 List of largest container shipping companies
 Grimaldi Group
 Ocean Network Express
 Nippon Yusen Kaisha
 American Roll-on Roll-off Carrier
 Messina Line

References

Shipping companies of the United States
Container shipping companies
Grimaldi Group
Car carrier shipping companies
Ro-ro shipping companies